The 1981 Ontario general election was held on March 19, 1981, to elect members of the 32nd Legislative Assembly of the Province of Ontario, Canada.

The governing Ontario Progressive Conservative Party, led by Bill Davis, was re-elected for a twelfth consecutive term in office. The PCs finally won a majority government after winning only minorities in the 1975 and 1977 elections.  The Liberal Party, led by Stuart Smith, was able to maintain its standing in the Legislature, while the New Democratic Party, led by Michael Cassidy, lost a significant number of seats, allowing the Tories to win a majority.

Results

1 Excludes T. Patrick Reid, a Liberal MPP who was re-elected in 1977 as a Liberal-Labour candidate (he had previously been elected as Liberal-Labour in 1967 but was re-elected in 1971 and 1975 as a straight Liberal). In 1981 he ran again and was re-elected as a Liberal-Labour.

A number of unregistered parties also fielded candidates in this election.

There were a number of Rhinoceros Party candidates in the Toronto area, and the party may have also fielded candidates elsewhere in the province. The Workers Communist Party (Marxist–Leninist) a single candidate, Judy Darcy. Ronald G. Rodgers, founder of the Détente Party of Canada, contested a Toronto constituency.

Social Credit leader Reg Gervais announced prior to the election that he planned to run in Nickel Belt, but could not follow through and resigned at a meeting of nominated candidates where John Turmel was appointed interim leader of the Ontario Social Credit Party during the campaign, though there has never been independent confirmation of this (nor is it clear if the Ottawa-area candidacies of Turmel and Raymond Turmel and Serge Girard and Dale Alkerton and Andrew Dynowski were approved by the remaining few members of the official Social Credit Party of Ontario).

Constituency results

Algoma:

(incumbent) Bud Wildman (NDP) 7096
Vyrn Peterson (PC) 4770
Dan Koob (L) 1567	

Algoma—Manitoulin:

(incumbent) John Lane (PC) 7160
Ernest Massicotte (L) 2986
Peter Boychuk (NDP) 2336

Armourdale:

(incumbent) Bruce McCaffrey (PC) 15938
Tim Rutledge (L) 8997
Bob Hebdon (NDP) 4240

Beaches—Woodbine:

(incumbent) Marion Bryden (NDP) 9590
Paul Christie (PC) 9266
Wayne Cook (L) 3140
Rhino Flosznik (Ind [Rhinoceros]) 252

Bellwoods:

(incumbent) Ross McClellan (NDP) 5111
Walter Bardyn (L) 4746
Tina Gabriel (PC) 2186
Sylvie Baillargeon (Comm) 246
Ronald G. Rodgers (Ind [Détente Party]) 180

Brampton:

(incumbent) Bill Davis (PC) 24973
Bob Callahan (L) 9391
David Moulton (NDP) 6034
Jim Bridgewood (Comm) 390

Brantford:

Phil Gillies (PC) 12847
(incumbent) Mac Makarchuk (NDP) 9588
Herb German (L) 5896

Brant—Oxford—Haldimand:

(incumbent) Robert Nixon (L) 13067
Ian Birnie (PC) 6034	
W.E. Jefferies (NDP) 2899

Brock:

(incumbent) Bob Welch (PC) 10547
Bill Andres (L) 6882
Heather Lee Kilty (NDP) 4204

Burlington South:

(incumbent) George Kerr (PC) 19037
Pearl Cameron (L) 8953
Michael C. Wright (NDP) 4942

Cambridge:

Bill Barlow (PC) 12597
(incumbent) Monty Davidson (NDP) 11748
John Giles (L) 4527
George Molson Barrett 549

Carleton:

(incumbent) Bob Mitchell (PC) 17846
Hans Daigeler (L) 8621
Judy Wasylycia-Leis (NDP) 5446
Andrew Dana Dynowski (Ind [SCO]) 383

Carleton East:

Bob MacQuarrie (PC) 15714
Bernard Grandmaitre (L) 14028
(incumbent) Evelyn Gigantes (NDP) 11579

Carleton-Grenville:

(incumbent) Norm Sterling (PC) 15202
Paul Raina (L) 5764
Alan White (NDP) 2391

Chatham—Kent:

(incumbent) Andy Watson (PC) 9471
Ron Franko (NDP) 6508
Darcy Want (L) 6466

Cochrane North:

René Piché (PC) 5910
Jean-Paul Bourgeault (L) 5722
Emil Touchette (NDP) 4426
Richard Coatsworth (Lbt) 274

Cochrane South:

(incumbent) Alan Pope (PC) 12540
John Sullivan (L) 6975
Cliff Simpson (NDP) 2777

Cornwall:

(incumbent) George Samis (NDP) 9484
Jim Kirkey (PC) 7817
Brian Lynch (L) 5333

Don Mills:

(incumbent) Dennis Timbrell (PC) 17516
Murad Velshi (L) 5368
Michael Lee (NDP) 4487

Dovercourt:

(incumbent) Tony Lupusella (NDP) 5491
Gil Gillespie (L) 5197
John Burigana (PC) 3416
Vince Corriero (Ind [Independent Liberal]) 258
Mel Doig (Comm) 162

Downsview:

(incumbent) Odoardo Di Santo (NDP) 8644
Joseph Volpe (L) 7991
Ross Charles (PC) 5475

Dufferin—Simcoe:

(incumbent) George McCague (PC) 18101
Larry MacKenzie (L) 6702
Ed Robinson (NDP) 4007

Durham East:

(incumbent) Sam Cureatz (PC) 14900
Bruce McArthur (NDP) 8648
Jim Potticary (L) 7226
Jeff Hubbell 253

Durham West:

(incumbent) George Ashe (PC) 17029
Norman Wei (L) 7446
Hugh Peacock (NDP) 6578
Bill Leslie (Lbt) 1215

Durham—York:

Ross Stevenson (PC) 14404
Gary Adamson (L) 6330
Margaret Wilbur (NDP) 4314

Eglinton:

(incumbent) Roy McMurtry (PC) 17386
Keith Polson (L) 5606
Eileen Elmy (NDP) 3324
Angelo R. Cosentini (Lbt) 466

Elgin:

(incumbent) Ron McNeil (PC) 13119
Maurice Dillon (L) 7306
Gord Campbell (NDP) 3250

Erie:

(incumbent) Ray Haggerty (L) 8796
Cam McKnight (PC) 5271
Barrie MacLeod (NDP) 3586

Essex North:

(incumbent) Dick Ruston (L) 9187
Marcel Lefebvre (NDP) 5911
Ron Arkell (PC) 4812

Essex South:

(incumbent) Remo Mancini (L) 10454
Wayne Patterson (PC) 5008
Blake Sanford (NDP) 4349

Etobicoke:

(incumbent) Ed Philip (NDP) 10373
Aileen Anderson (PC) 8024
Laureano Leone (L) 7132

Fort William:

(incumbent) Mickey Hennessy (PC) 13038
Paul Lannon (NDP) 7585
Mike Burns (L) 3381

Frontenac—Addington:

(incumbent) J. Earl McEwen (L) 10558
Murray Gorham (PC) 10218
Vincent Maloney (NDP) 2374
Ross Baker 409
Sally Hayes (Lbt) 322

Grey:

(incumbent) Bob McKessock (L) 13334
John Young (PC) 8793
Joan Stone (NDP) 1629
Eric Biggins (Lbt) 284

Grey—Bruce:

(incumbent) Eddie Sargent (L) 14006
Bob Rutherford (PC) 7767
Frank Butler (NDP) 1455

Haldimand—Norfolk:

(incumbent) Gordon Miller (L) 16254
Clarence Abbott (PC) 8775
Lois Berry (NDP) 3744

Halton—Burlington:

(incumbent) Julian Reed (L) 13395
Fran Baines (PC) 12877
Chris Cutler (NDP) 3500

Hamilton Centre:

Sheila Copps (L) 9734
(incumbent) Mike Davison (NDP) 6930
Brenda Riis (PC) 4039

Hamilton East:

(incumbent) Robert W. Mackenzie (NDP) 12773
Mike Riley (L) 8365
Gabe Macaluso (PC) 6351

Hamilton Mountain:

(incumbent) Brian Charlton (NDP) 11008
Duncan Beattie (PC) 10811
Vince Agro (L) 8956

Hamilton West:

(incumbent) Stuart Smith (L) 12106
Alec Murray (PC) 9788
Joy Warner (NDP) 4255
Elizabeth Rowley (Comm) 260

Hastings—Peterborough:

Jim Pollock (PC) 11528
Dave Hobson (L) 8741
Elmer Buchanan (NDP) 2968

High Park—Swansea:

Yuri Shymko (PC) 11473
(incumbent) Ed Ziemba (NDP) 8793
Peter C. Simonelis (L) 3635
Bob Cumming (Lbt) 507

Humber:

Morley Kells (PC) 20844
Jim Mills (L) 10064
Jacquie Chic (NDP) 3583

Huron—Bruce:

Murray Elston (L) 12164
Gary Harron (PC) 11940
Tony McQuail (NDP) 1979

Huron—Middlesex:

(incumbent) Jack Riddell (L) 10707
Jim Britnell (PC) 8618
Gwen Pemberton (NDP) 1170

Kenora:

(incumbent) Leo Bernier (PC) 10418
Colin Wasacase (NDP) 4170
Jeff Holmes (Liberal-Labour) 2536

Kent—Elgin:

(incumbent) Jim McGuigan (L) 10115
Wes Thompson (PC) 9778
Ed Cutler (NDP) 1591

Kingston and the Islands:

(incumbent) Keith Norton (PC) 12488
Carl Ross (L) 8465
Ron Murray (NDP) 3897

Kitchener:

(incumbent) Jim Breithaupt (L) 12592
Morley Rosenberg (PC) 7982
Ian MacFarlane (NDP) 4126

Kitchener—Wilmot:

(incumbent) John Sweeney  (L) 11515
Alan Barron (PC) 8513
Hemi Mitic (NDP) 3686

Lake Nipigon:

(incumbent) Jack Stokes (NDP) 7846
John Paziuk (PC) 1828
John Lentowicz (L) 1714

Lambton:

(incumbent) Lorne Henderson (PC) 13467
Leigh Crozier (L) 6435
Ralph Wensley (NDP) 1276

Lanark—Renfrew:

(incumbent) Douglas Wiseman (PC) 10502
Ray Matthey (L) 3864
Cliff Bennett (NDP) 2659

Lakeshore:

Al Kolyn (PC) 10607
Don Sullivan (NDP) 9375
Bill Whelton (L) 5738
Gordon Flowers (Comm) 376

Leeds:

Bob Runciman (PC) 13725
John Fournell (L) 4643
Bob Smith (NDP) 2940

Lincoln:

Philip Andrewes (PC) 10044
(incumbent) Ross Hall (L) 9650
Paavo Vuorinen (NDP) 2009

London Centre:

(incumbent) David Peterson (L) 12315
Russ Monteith (PC) 8329
Diane Risler (NDP) 3189

London North:

(incumbent) Ron Van Horne (L) 15444
Ted Browne (PC) 11825
Sam Saumur (NDP) 3864

London South:

(incumbent) Gordon Walker (PC) 19714
Frank Green (L) 11116
Dale Green (NDP) 5187

Middlesex:

(incumbent) Robert G. Eaton (PC) 11672
Bob Coulthard (L) 8264
Larry Green (NDP) 2155

Mississauga East:

(incumbent) Bud Gregory (PC) 15759
Murray Schelter (L) 7716
Doug Bennett (NDP) 4829

Mississauga North:

(incumbent) Terry Jones (PC) 20331
John Brooks (L) 9130
Sylvia Weylie (NDP) 6667

Mississauga South:

(incumbent) Douglas Kennedy (PC) 14165
Basil Gerol (L) 7172
Neil Davis (NDP) 4126

Muskoka:

(incumbent) Frank Miller (PC) 9029
Ken McClellan (L) 4148
Jim Maguire (NDP) 3214

Niagara Falls:

(incumbent) Vince Kerrio (L) 12495
Ted Salci (PC) 9295
Dick Harrington (NDP) 4665

Nickel Belt:

(incumbent) Floyd Laughren (NDP) 8451
Elmer Sopha (L) 5041
Andre Lalande (PC) 1915

Nipissing:

Mike Harris (PC) 15795
(incumbent) Mike Bolan (L) 10924
Art Peltomaa (NDP) 1774

Northumberland:

Howard Sheppard (PC) 14727
William A. Wyatt (L) 11113
Ben Burd (NDP) 2711

Oakville:

(incumbent) James W. Snow (PC) 16366
Walt Elliot (L) 7286
Zona Hollingsworth (NDP) 2562

Oakwood:

(incumbent) Tony Grande (NDP) 8862
Harriet Wolman (PC) 5961
Jean Gammage (L) 4171
Nan McDonald (Comm) 624

Oriole:

(incumbent) John Williams (PC) 15644
David Pretty (L) 11400
Lynn McDonald (NDP) 4443

Oshawa:

(incumbent) Michael Breaugh (NDP) 10307
Bob Boychyn (PC) 7836
Ivan Wallace (L) 3311

Ottawa Centre:

(incumbent) Michael Cassidy (NDP) 9316
David Small (PC) 8717
Karl Feige (L) 6926
John Turmel (Ind [SCO]) 376

Ottawa East:

(incumbent) Albert J. Roy (L) 14207
Omer Deslauriers (PC) 4235
Danielle Page (NDP) 1905
Serge Girard (Ind [SCO]) 177

Ottawa South:

(incumbent) Claude Bennett (PC) 15218
Robert Dyck (L) 8832
Chris Chilton (NDP) 6146
Ray Turmel (Ind [SCO]) 259

Ottawa West:

(incumbent) Reuben Baetz (PC) 17418
George Anderson (L) 9112
Lofty MacMillan (NDP) 2348
Dale E. Alkerton (Ind [SCO]) 494

Oxford:

Dick Treleaven (PC) 15948
John Finlay (L) 11866
Wayne Colbran (NDP) 3673
Kaye Sargent (Lbt) 493

Parkdale:

Tony Ruprecht (L) 6941
(incumbent) Jan Dukszta (NDP) 6020
Verrol Whitmore (PC) 2914
Bill McGinnis (Ind) 289
Anna Larsen (Comm) 259

Parry Sound:

Ernie Eves (PC) 8955
Richard Thomas (L) 8949
Arthur Davis (NDP) 1448

Perth:

(incumbent) Hugh Edighoffer (L) 16283
Colleen Misener (PC) 7883
Scott Wilson (NDP) 1881

Peterborough:

(incumbent) John Turner (PC) 17962
Peter Adams (L) 11263
Paul Rexe (NDP) 8756
John Hayes (Lbt) 787
Bruce Knapp (Ind) 286
Kenneth T. Burgess (Ind) 59

Port Arthur:

(incumbent) Jim Foulds (NDP) 12258
Allan Laakkonen (PC) 10844
Kenneth R. Tilson (L) 3247
Dennis Deveau (Ind) 140
Paul Pugh (Comm) 103

Prescott and Russell:

Don Boudria (L) 15123
(incumbent) Joseph Albert Bélanger (PC) 9951
Claude Dion (NDP) 1828

Prince Edward—Lennox:

(incumbent) James Taylor (PC) 11135
Dan Brady (L) 6797
Bob King (NDP) 1423

Quinte:

(incumbent) Hugh O’Neil (L) 14861
George Mills (PC) 9517
Reg Pearson (NDP) 1795

Rainy River:

(incumbent) T. Patrick Reid (Liberal-Labour) 4575
Jack Pierce (PC) 4149
Alan M. Tibbetts (NDP) 2438

Renfrew North:

(incumbent) Sean Conway (L) 9113
Bryan D. Hocking (PC) 7137
Phil Chester (NDP) 1086

Renfrew South:

(incumbent) Paul Yakabuski (PC) 14552
Dick Trainor (L) 10420
Lynne Pattinson (NDP) 1174

Riverdale:

(incumbent) Jim Renwick (NDP) 6770
Peter Hesky (PC) 4088
Ed Schofield (L) 3237
Thelma R. Forsyth (Ind) 233
Anna Sideris (Comm) 158

St. Andrew—St. Patrick:

(incumbent) Larry Grossman (PC) 10674
Anne Johnston (L) 6839
Stanley E. Kutz (NDP) 3709
Judy Darcy (Ind [Workers Communist Party]) 262
Jeanne McGuire (Comm) 148
Sophia M. Firth (Ind) 106

St. Catharines:

St. David:

(incumbent) Margaret Scrivener (PC) 9627
Ian Scott (L) 8605
Tyrone Turner (NDP) 5985
Rhino Mappin (Ind [Rhinoceros]) 243

St. George:

Susan Fish (PC) 12390
Bruce McLeod (L) 8139
Dan Leckie (NDP) 4999
George Hislop (Ind) 2677
Bruce Evoy (Lbt) 359
Rhino Mills (Ind [Rhinoceros]) 194
Gary Weagle (Ind) 57

Sarnia:

Andy Brandt (PC) 13871
(incumbent) Paul Blundy (L) 10842
Stu Sullivan (NDP) 5292

Sault Ste. Marie:

(incumbent) Russ Ramsay (PC) 14712
Albert Ferranti (L) 7555
Susan Brothers (NDP) 7162

Scarborough Centre:

(incumbent) Frank Drea (PC) 12793
Paul Rook (NDP) 4898
Kurt Christensen (L) 4657
D’Arcy Cain (Lbt) 531

Scarborough East:

(incumbent) Margaret Birch (PC) 16386
Charles Beer (L) 7301
Gordon Wilson (NDP) 4826
Jim McIntosh (Lbt) 562
Jeff Nelles (Ind [Rhinoceros]) 171

Scarborough—Ellesmere:

Alan Robinson (PC) 11608
(incumbent) David Warner (NDP) 9720
Joe Gideon (L) 4545

Scarborough North:

(incumbent) Thomas Leonard Wells (PC) 29961
Vera Jean Brookes (L) 12663
Jerry Daca (NDP) 6512

Scarborough West:

(incumbent) Richard Johnston (NDP) 10019
John Adams (PC) 9644
Barbara Fava (L) 3914
Kevin James (Ind [Rhinoceros]) 369

Simcoe Centre:

(incumbent) George Taylor (PC) 16926
Bruce Owen (L) 12505
Gaye Lamb (NDP) 4532

Simcoe East:

Al McLean (PC) 12487
Fayne Bullen (NDP) 9085
Jack Harber (L) 7320
Ted Wolda (Ind) 749

Stormont—Dundas and Glengarry:

(incumbent) Osie Villeneuve (PC) 12487
Gerry Rosenquist (L) 7846
Joe O’Neil (NDP) 1836

Sudbury:

Jim Gordon (PC) 12043
(incumbent) Bud Germa (NDP) 8052
Jim Marchbank (L) 5998
Richard Orlandini (Comm) 115

Sudbury East:

(incumbent) Elie Martel (NDP) 13883
George McDonald (PC) 9420
Esther Davidson (L) 4909

Timiskaming:

(incumbent) Ed Havrot (PC) 8377
Bob Bain (NDP) 6768
Leo St. Cyr (L) 3593

Victoria—Haliburton:

(incumbent) John Eakins (L) 12807
Dave Murray (PC) 10509
Art Field (NDP) 2449

Waterloo North:

(incumbent) Herbert Epp (L) 12843
Bob Labbett (PC) 9606
Bob Needham (NDP) 3672

Welland—Thorold:

(incumbent) Mel Swart (NDP) 13379
Al Lacavera (L) 7916
Ivy Riddell (PC) 5564

Wellington—Dufferin—Peel:

(incumbent) Jack Johnson (PC) 16644
Elbert van Donkersgoed (L) 8136
Marion Chambers (NDP) 4650

Wellington South:

(incumbent) Harry Worton (L) 16237
Peter Mercer (PC) 7917
Terry Crowley (NDP) 5934
Lynne Hulley (Comm) 224

Wentworth:

Gordon Dean (PC) 10024
(incumbent) Colin Isaacs (NDP) 9864
Frank Herman (L) 8847

Wentworth North:

(incumbent) Eric Cunningham (L) 16433
Ann Sloat (PC) 12213
Jody Orr (NDP) 4702

Wilson Heights:

(incumbent) David Rotenberg (PC) 11722
Elinor Caplan (L) 8797
Greg Ioannou (NDP) 3623

Windsor—Riverside:

(incumbent) Dave Cooke (NDP) 13626
Gerry Levesque (L) 9102
Sandy Thomson (PC) 4418
John H. Snyder (Ind) 333

Windsor—Sandwich:

Bill Wrye (L) 7449
(incumbent) Ted Bounsall (NDP) 7315
Tony Brechkow (PC) 3479
Mike Longmoore (Comm) 258

Windsor—Walkerville:

(incumbent) Bernard Newman (L) 10553
Ray Simpson (NDP) 4988
Tom Porter (PC) 3428
Gerard O’Neil (Comm) 238

York Centre:

Don Cousens (PC) 19094
(incumbent) Alf Stong (L) 17372
John Campey (NDP) 3701

York East:

(incumbent) Robert Elgie (PC) 14562
Lois Cox (NDP) 4935
Don McNeill (L) 4811
Ed McDonald (Comm) 628
E. Scott Hughes (Unparty) 460

York Mills:

(incumbent) Bette Stephenson (PC) 20613
Isadore Weinberg (L) 5667
Dave Crisp (NDP) 3858
Scott Bell (Lbt) 1287

York North:

(incumbent) Bill Hodgson (PC) 18405
Jim Wilson (L) 10216
Keith Munro (NDP) 4614

York South:

(incumbent) Donald C. MacDonald (NDP) 9518
Les Green (L) 8099
Barbara Jafelice (PC) 7628
Mike Phillips (Comm) 472

Yorkview:

Michael Spensieri (L) 10160
Mike Morrone (NDP) 8973
Biran Yandell (PC) 5329
Frank Esposito (Ind) 798
Jack Sweet (Comm) 503
Richard A. Brandenburg (Ind) 352
Victor Heyn (Ind) 193

York West:

(incumbent) Nick Leluk (PC) 18501
Michael Eagen (L) 10228
Pauline Durning (NDP) 2865
Don Douloff (Ind [Rhinoceros]) 538

Post-election changes
Hamilton West:  Stuart Smith resigned his legislative seat on January 25, 1982, and a by-election was called for June 17, 1982.

Richard Allen (NDP) 8915
Bob McMurrich (PC) 7066
Joe Barbera (L) 6952
John Turmel  174

York South:  Donald C. MacDonald resigned his legislative seat in 1982, and a by-election was called for November 4, 1982.

Bob Rae (NDP) 11212
John Nunziata (L) 8595
Barbara Jafelice (PC) 4376
Myron Petriw (Lbt) 234
John Turmel  66

Stormont—Dundas and Glengarry:  Osie Villeneuve died in 1983, and a by-election has called on December 15, 1983:
Noble Villeneuve (PC) 12197
Johnny Whitteker (L) 8062
Rudi Derstroff (NDP) 627
John Turmel  97

Frontenac—Addington:  Liberal MPP J. Earl McEwen crossed the floor to join the Progressive Conservatives in 1984.

Hamilton Centre:  Sheila Copps resigned her legislative seat in 1984, and a by-election was held on December 13, 1984:

Mike Davison (NDP) 5308
Lily Oddie Munro (L) 5253
Sandi Bell (PC) 3314
Kerry Wilson (Comm) 124

Ottawa Centre:  Michael Cassidy resigned his legislative seat in 1984, and a by-election was held on December 13, 1984.

Evelyn Gigantes (NDP) 8165
Graham Bird (PC) 5870
Lowell Green (L) 5202
Greg Vezina (G) 130
Ray Joseph Cormier  94
John Turmel  90

Ottawa East:  Albert J. Roy resigned his legislative seat in 1984, and a by-election was held on December 13, 1984:

Bernard Grandmaître (L) 7754
Richard Boudreau (PC) 1934
Jean Gilbert (NDP) 1531
Serge Girard  122

Prescott and Russell:  Don Boudria resigned his legislative seat in 1984, and a by-election was held on December 13, 1984:

Jean Poirier (L) 10182
Gaston Patenaude (PC) 8347
Rheo Lalonde (NDP) 1791

Wentworth North:  Eric Cunningham resigned his legislative seat in 1984, and a by-election was held on December 13, 1984:

Ann Sloat (PC) 8524
Chris Ward (L) 8355
Lynn Spencer (NDP) 3115
George Graham (Lbt) 162

Riverdale:  Jim Renwick died in 1984.

Kitchener:  Jim Breithaupt resigned in 1984.

Rainy River:  T. Patrick Reid resigned in 1984.

Eglinton:  Roy McMurtry resigned his seat in 1985 to take a government position in the United Kingdom.

See also
Politics of Ontario
List of Ontario political parties
Premier of Ontario
Leader of the Opposition (Ontario)

Further reading

References

1981 elections in Canada
1981
1981 in Ontario
March 1981 events in Canada